The Friulian Dolomites Natural Park is a nature reserve in Friuli-Venezia Giulia, Italy. Established in 1996, it encompasses the Friulian Dolomites and the upper Tagliamento valley and is the largest natural park in Friuli-Venezia Giulia. It is mostly located in the province of Pordenone, with a smaller part in the province of Udine.

The park's fauna includes chamoises, roe deers, red deers, alpine ibexes, marmots, capercaillies, peregrine falcons, black grouses, and golden eagles (sixteen specimens), which are the symbol of the park. 

Nine visitor centers are located within the park.

References

External links 
Official website

Friulian Dolomites
1996 establishments in Italy
Friulian Dolomites
Dolomites